Kout may refer to:

 KOUT, radio station in Rapid City, South Dakota

People with the surname 
 Jiří Kout, Czech conductor

See also
 Phou Kout District, a district of Xiangkhouang Province, northern-central Laos
 Přední kout, small hill in the South Moravia, Czech Republic
 Kout na Šumavě, village and municipality in Domažlice District, Plzeň Region, Czech Republic
 Kouts (disambiguation)